The following is a list of notable individuals associated with Barnard College through attendance as a student, service as a member of the faculty or staff, or award of the Barnard Medal of Distinction.

Notable alumnae

Academics and scientists
Anne Anastasi (1928), American psychologist known for her pioneering development of psychometrics, former president of American Psychological Association, recipient of the National Medal of Science
Naomi André (1989), professor of music at the University of North Carolina at Chapel Hill
Natalie Angier (1978), author, science journalist for The New York Times, winner of the Pulitzer Prize for Beat Reporting
Nina Ansary (1989), historian, author, one of the six UN Women Champions for Innovation, daughter of Iranian diplomat and philanthropist Hushang Ansary
Jacqueline Barton (1974), Caltech chemist and MacArthur Fellows Program "genius grant" winner
Jean Baum (1980), Distinguished Professor of Chemistry and Chemical Biology at Rutgers University
Helen M. Berman (1964), Board of Governors Professor of Chemistry and Chemical Biology at Rutgers University
Martha Biondi (1985), professor of African American studies at Northwestern University
Joan Birman (1948), mathematician and winner of the Chauvenet Prize
Hazel Bishop (1929), chemist and inventor of innovative cosmetics
Edyta Bojanowska (1993), professor of Slavic languages and literature at Yale University
Hendrika B. Cantwell (1944), clinical professor of pediatrics, advocate for abused and neglected children
Marian Chertow (1977), academic specializing in environmental resource management
Susan Cole (1962), first female president of Montclair State University
Frances Gardiner Davenport (1890–1), historian
Stacey D'Erasmo (1983), American author and critic, professor at Fordham University
Jerrilynn Dodds (1973), art historian, former dean of Sarah Lawrence College
Ingrith Johnson Deyrup-Olsen (1940), American zoologist, daughter of The New School founder and first president Alvin Saunders Johnson
Mabel Smith Douglass (1899), educator and namesake of Douglass Residential College of Rutgers University
Carol Dweck (1967), professor of psychology at Stanford University
Pam Eddinger (1982), president of Bunker Hill Community College
Jessica Einhorn (1967), former dean of the Paul H. Nitze School of Advanced International Studies
Hope Tisdale Eldridge (1925), physical educator, demographer and statistician at the United Nations
Firth Haring Fabend (1959), novelist and historian
Nancy Farriss (1959), historian, professor at University of Pennsylvania
Jessica Garretson Finch (1893), author, suffragette, founding President of Finch College
Katherine Elizabeth Fleming (1987), provost of New York University
Katherine Franke (1981), professor at Columbia Law School
Ellen V. Futter (1971), President of Barnard College and the American Museum of Natural History
Susan Gal (1970), anthropologist, professor at University of Chicago
Lynn Garafola (1968), dance historian
Virginia Gildersleeve (1899), Dean of Barnard College and delegate to the charter conference of the United Nations in 1945
Karen Goldberg (1983), Vagelos Professor of Energy Research at University of Pennsylvania
Nieca Goldberg (1979), doctor at the NYU Langone Medical Center
Rebecca Goldstein (1972), philosopher, biographer, and novelist
Ruth L. Gottesman (1952), professor of pediatrics at Albert Einstein College of Medicine, philanthropist, wife of David Gottesman
Monica Green (1978), medieval historian and Professor of History at Arizona State University
Maxine Greene (1938), educator, philosopher, activist; past president of the American Educational Research Association 
Patricia Greenspan (1966), professor of philosophy at the University of Maryland, College Park
Miriam Griffin (1956), classical scholar at Somerville College, Oxford
Ellen R. Gritz (1964), cancer researcher at University of Texas MD Anderson Cancer Center
Ruth T. Gross (1941), pediatrician, first woman to hold an endowed chair at Stanford University
Evelyn Byrd Harrison (1941), classical scholar, archaeologist, Fellow of the American Academy of Arts and Sciences
Louise Holland (1893–1990), academic, philologist and archaeologist
Lise Morjé Howard (1991), political scientist, professor at Georgetown University
Judith Herzfeld (1967), Professor of Biophysical Chemistry at Brandeis University
Evelyn Hu (1969), Gordon McKay Professor of Applied Physics and Electrical Engineering at Harvard University
Jean Blackwell Hutson (1969), librarian, archivist, chief of the Schomburg Center for Research in Black Culture
Karla Jay (1968), pioneer of lesbian and gay studies
Frances Kamm (1960), philosopher, professor at Rutgers University
Darcy Kelley (1970), American neurobiologist, professor at Columbia University
Linda K. Kerber (1960), feminist intellectual historian, professor at University of Iowa
Mirra Komarovsky (1926), sociologist; pioneer in the sociology of gender 
Mabel Lang (1939), archeologist and professor at Bryn Mawr College
Linda Laubenstein, MD (1969), HIV/AIDS researcher
Sylvia Lavin (1982), professor at the Princeton University School of Architecture
Janna Levin (1988), cosmologist and Associate Professor of Physics and Astronomy at Barnard College
Helen Longino (1960), philosopher of science, professor at Stanford University
Susan Lowey (1950), biophysicist and professor of the University of Vermont
Susan Mailer (1971), American psychoanalyst, writer, and academic, daughter of novelist Norman Mailer
Joyce Lee Malcolm (1963), professor at Antonin Scalia Law School
Rita Gunther McGrath (1981), business book author; Professor at Columbia Business School
Elizabeth M. McNally (1983), geneticist, professor at Northwestern University
Eileen McNamara (1974), professor of journalism at Brandeis University; formerly Pulitzer Prize-winning columnist of The Boston Globe
Margaret Mead (1923), anthropologist
Barbara Stoler Miller (1962), scholar of Sanskrit literature known for the translation of the Bhagavad Gita
Nancy K. Miller (1961), American literary scholar, feminist theorist and memoirist, professor at Graduate Center, CUNY
Dorothy Miner (1926), American art historian, curator at Walters Art Museum
Gertrude Moakley (1926) American librarian and noted Tarot scholar.
Cathryn Nagler (1979), immunologist, professor at the University of Chicago
Eva Neer (1959), American chemist, professor at Columbia University College of Physicians & Surgeons
Gertrude Neumark (1948), American physicist and former professor of Columbia University
Elissa L. Newport (1969), American psycholinguist, professor at Georgetown University
Barbara Novak (1950), art historian at Barnard College, 1982 National Book Award for Nonfiction finalist
Aihwa Ong (1974), American anthropologist and professor at University of California, Berkeley and 2001 MacArthur Fellow
Anne Paolucci (1947), Italian American writer, dramatist, professor at St. John's University
Elsie Clews Parsons (1896), first woman elected President of the American Anthropological Association
Esther Pasztory (1965), scholar of Pre-Columbian Art at Columbia University
Marjorie Perloff (1953), professor of English at Stanford University
Helen Perlstein Pollard (1967), archaeologist, ethnologist, Mesoamericanist scholar, professor of anthropology at MSU
Helen Ranney (1941), first woman to lead a university department of medicine in the U.S., be president of the Association of American Physicians, or serve as a Distinguished Physician of the Veterans Administration
Amy Richards (1992), American historian and feminist activist
Ida Rolf (1916), biochemist, founder of Rolfing Structural Integration
Barbara Rose (1957), art historian and founding director of the Katzen Arts Center at American University, first wife of artist Frank Stella
Ora Mendelsohn Rosen (1956), cell biology researcher
Louise Rosenblatt (1920s), influential literary theorist and educator
Joan Ruderman (1969), professor at Harvard University
Mavis Sanders (1987), research scholar
Myriam Sarachik (1954), American physicist, professor at the City College of New York and recipient of the Oliver E. Buckley Condensed Matter Prize in 2005
Kim Lane Scheppele (1975), political scientist, professor at Princeton School of Public and International Affairs
Anna Schwartz (1933), economist
Shuly Rubin Schwartz (1988), first female chancellor of the Jewish Theological Seminary of America
Anne A. Scitovsky (1937), health economist, former member of the President's Commission for the Study of Ethical Problems in Medicine and Biomedical and Behavioral Research
Susan C. Scrimshaw (1967), medical anthropologist, former president of Simmons University and The Sage Colleges
Samah Selim (1986), professor of Arabic literature at Rutgers University
Louise Slade (1968), food scientist
Vivian Sobchack (1961), cultural critic
Maya Soetoro-Ng (1993), educator; half-sister of President Barack Obama
Judith E. Stein (1965), art historian and curator
Barbara J. Stoll (1971), former dean of the University of Texas Health Science Center at Houston
Barbara Lerner Spectre (1964), academic and scholar on Jewish studies
Amy Sueyoshi (1993), historian and academic 
Susan Rubin Suleiman (1960), professor of French literature at Harvard University 
Hessy Levinsons Taft (1955), chemistry professor at St. John's University  
Abigail Thernstrom (1958), American political scientist and conservative scholar on race relations, voting rights and education who served on the United States Commission on Civil Rights
Erin L. Thompson (2002), professor of art at John Jay College of Criminal Justice
Judith Jarvis Thomson (1950), philosopher and professor at Massachusetts Institute of Technology
Merryl Tisch (1977), educator, chancellor, New York State Board of Regents; wife of James S. Tisch, heir to the Loews Corporation
Nim Tottenham (1996), professor of psychology at Columbia University
Jessie Ann Owens (1971), professor of music at University of California, Davis
Diane E. Pataki (1993), professor at the University of Utah and recipient of the James B. Macelwane Medal in 2008
Lila Wallis (1947), physician, former president of the American Medical Women's Association and pioneer in women's health
Beatrice Warde (1920s), calligrapher, librarian, researcher on type matters and influence upon 20th century typography
Katherine Brehme Warren (1930), geneticist and scientific editor
Susan Weber (1977), professor of Bard Graduate Center and wife of George Soros
Helen L. Webster (1853-1928), philologist and educator
Judith Weisenfeld (1986), scholar of Afro-American religion, professor at Princeton University
Karen Wilkin (1962), art critic and curator
Irene J. Winter (1960), American art historian, professor at Harvard University

Actresses and performers

Sissy Biggers (1979), host of Ready.. Set... Cook! 1996–2000
Franziska Boas (1923), dancer, percussionist and dance therapist
Clara Bryant (2007), actress
Catherine de Castelbajac (1975), model and fashion journalist
Michelle Collins (2002), American comedian and talk show host, former presenter of The View
Jill Eikenberry (1968), actress
Denise Faye (1996), director, choreographer, actress
Greta Gerwig (2006), actress, screenwriter, filmmaker who won the Golden Globe Award for Best Motion Picture – Musical or Comedy in 2018 and was nominated for two Academy Awards
Jaime Gleicher (2010), reality star, producer, psychotherapist.
Lauren Graham (1988), actress, played Lorelai Gilmore on TV show Gilmore Girls
Sprague Grayden (2000s), actress, played Judith Montgomery on Joan of Arcadia
Alexandra Guarnaschelli (1991), celebrity chef at Butter Restaurant in New York City, television personality 
Anshula Kapoor (2012), daughter of Indian film producer Boney Kapoor and member of the Kapoor family in Hindi cinema
Shari Lewis (dropped out – 1950s), ventriloquist, puppeteer, television show host 
Mozhan Marnò (2001), actress, House of Cards
Peggy McCay (1949), actress
Kelly McCreary (2003), actress, Grey's Anatomy
Julie Mond (2000s), actress 
Cynthia Nixon (1988), actress, played Miranda Hobbes on TV show Sex and the City
Chelsea Peretti (2000), actress, writer for TV show Parks and Recreation
Lee Remick (dropped out – 1953), actress
Ariane Rinehart (2015), actress, played Liesl on The Sound of Music Live!
Joan Rivers (1954), star comedian, TV host
Christy Carlson Romano (2009), actress, voice of Kim Possible
Frankie Shaw (2007), actress on Mr. Robot
Vinessa Shaw (dropped out – 1990s), actress, 40 Days and 40 Nights
Ebonie Smith (2007), actress, The Jeffersons
Leslie Stefanson (1993), actress, The General's Daughter
Zuzanna Szadkowski (2001), actress, played Dorota on TV show Gossip Girl
Sophia Takal (2007), actress and director
Twyla Tharp (1963), choreographer, dancer
Sarah Thompson (1990s), television actress
Donna Vivino (2000), actress and singer
Jane Wyatt (1932), Emmy Award-winning actress, Father Knows Best

Architects

Norma Merrick Sklarek (1950), first black woman to be licensed as an architect in the United States
Carole Rifkind (1956), American architectural critic, historian, and author, wife of cancer researcher Richard Rifkind

Artists

Afruz Amighi (1997), Iranian-born American sculptor, installation artist.
March Avery (1954), American painter, daughter of artist Milton Avery
Sana Amanat (2005), comic book creator and director at Marvel Comics, creator of Marvel's first Muslim female superhero, Ms. Marvel
Polly Barton (1978), textile artist
Sarah Charlesworth (1969), photographer and conceptual artist and professor at Princeton University
Madeline Hollander (2008), American artist and choreographer
Amy Hwang (2000), Asian American cartoonist for The New Yorker
Clermont Huger Lee (1936), landscape architect, Savannah Women of Vision
Michelle Lopez (1992), American sculptor and installation artist and 2019 Guggenheim Fellowship recipient
Maud Morgan (1926), modern artist
Josephine Paddock (1949), painter
Jane Teller (1933), sculptor and recipient of the 1988 Women's Caucus for Art Lifetime Achievement Award
Mierle Laderman Ukeles (1961), performance artist, winner of the 2001 Anonymous Was A Woman Award
Donna Zakowska (1975), Emmy Award-winning American costume designer for her work on John Adams

Athletes
Stacey Borgman (1993), member of crew team for the United States at the 2004 Olympics
Gloria Callen (1946), swimmer and Associated Press Athlete of the Year of 1942
Abby Marshall (2014), chess player; won 2009 Denker Tournament of High School Champions
Alexis Sablone (2008), American skateboarder and architect
Erinn Smart (2001), fencer for the United States at the 2004 Olympics silver medalist in team foil fencing at the Beijing 2008 Olympics
Robin Wagner (1980), figure-skating coach

Businesswomen

Flora Miller Biddle (attended), former president of the Whitney Museum of American Art, granddaughter of Gertrude Vanderbilt Whitney
Eileen Ford (1943), co-founder of Ford Models, one of the world's oldest and most influential modeling agencies
Phyllis E. Grann (1958), first female CEO of Penguin Putnam and editor of Knopf Doubleday
Elinor Guggenheimer (1933), civic leader, philanthropist 
Alexandra Creel Goelet (1974), heiress, niece of Robert David Lion Gardiner, wife of Robert Guestier Goelet and owner of Gardiners Island
Nina Griscom (1977), model, television host, socialite, businesswoman, stepdaughter of Felix Rohatyn
Mary Harriman Rumsey (1905), founder of nonprofit organization Junior League, daughter of railroad magnate E. H. Harriman and sister to New York Governor W. Averell Harriman
Anjli Jain (2003), executive director of CampusEAI Consortium
Madeline Kripke (1943–2020), book collector
Harriet Burton Laidlaw (1902), suffragist and first female corporate director of Standard & Poor's
Adele Lewisohn Lehman (1903), philanthropist and member of the Lehman family, daughter-in-law of Mayer Lehman
Liz Neumark (1977), founder and CEO of New York catering company Great Performances
Sheila Nevins (1960), president of HBO documentary films; winner of 27 Primetime Emmy Awards and 3 Peabody Awards
Joan Whitney Payson (1925), co-founder and majority of owner of the New York Mets, granddaughter of United States Secretary of State John Hay and member of the Whitney family
Azita Raji (1983), investment banker, United States Ambassador to Sweden
Helen Rogers Reid (1903), newspaper publisher, president of the New York Herald Tribune
Phyllis Robinson (1942), executive at Doyle Dane Bernbach
Cindy Rose (1985), president of Microsoft Western Europe
Devorah Rose (2002), socialite, entrepreneur and editor of Social Life magazine
Alexis Stewart (1987), daughter of Martha Stewart '64; TV host and radio personality
Martha Stewart (1964), business magnate, entrepreneur, homemaking advocate
Iphigene Ochs Sulzberger (1914), heiress, and owner of The New York Times, daughter of The New York Times publisher Adolph Ochs
Elizabeth Wiatt (1967), businesswoman in the fashion industry
Virginia Wright (1951), art collector, philanthropist who supported Seattle Art Museum

Journalists
Natalie Angier (1978), author and science writer for The New York Times; won the Pulitzer Prize for beat reporting in 1991
Jami Bernard (1978), film critic for The New York Post and The New York Daily News, founder of Barncat Publishing Inc.; author whose books include a memoir of surviving breast cancer
Katherine Boo (1988), recipient of Pulitzer Prize for Public Service in 2000 and the MacArthur Fellows Program "genius grant"
Mona Charen (1979), nationally syndicated columnist, political analyst, and author
Liz Clarke (1983), journalist for The Washington Post, co-host of The Tony Kornheiser Show
Herawati Diah (1941), Indonesian journalist
Deborah Feyerick (1987), journalist and CNN correspondent 
Laura Flanders (1984), correspondent for Air America and host of "GritTV"
Sylvana Foa (1967), first female news director of an American television network; first Spokeswoman for Secretary General of the United Nations
Rana Foroohar (1992), columnist for Financial Times
Alexis Gelber (1974), former president of the Overseas Press Club
Julianna Goldman (2003), CBS News correspondent 
Piri Halasz, correspondent for Time magazine and art critic
Maria Hinojosa (1984), correspondent for CNN; NOW on PBS; host of NPR's Latino USA
Cathy Horyn, fashion journalist, New York Times fashion critic
Freda Kirchwey (1915), journalist, editor and publisher of The Nation
Alex Kuczynski (1990), style reporter for The New York Times, daughter of Peruvian president Pedro Pablo Kuczynski
Minna Lewinson (1918), journalist for The New York Times, first woman to win a Pulitzer Prize
Juliet Macur (1992), sports journalist for The New York Times
Courtney E. Martin (2002), feminist author and editor of the feminist blog Feministing
Agnes E. Meyer (1907), American journalist, philanthropist, civil rights activist, and art patron, mother of The Washington Post publisher Katharine Graham
Judith Miller (1969), former correspondent for New York Times who reported on the story of Iraq's alleged WMD program; Aspen Strategy Group member
Nonnie Moore (c. 1946), fashion editor at Mademoiselle, Harper's Bazaar and GQ
Mary Ellis Peltz, music critic, poet, and first chief editor of Opera News
Anna Quindlen (1974), author and columnist for Newsweek who won the Pulitzer Prize for Commentary in 1992
Paola Ramos (2009), American journalist, daughter of TV anchor Jorge Ramos
Atoosa Rubenstein (1993), founder of CosmoGirl and editor-in-chief of Seventeen; youngest ever editor of a teen magazine
Susan Stamberg (1959), special correspondent, NPR's Morning Edition, former host of All Things Considered and the first woman in the United States to anchor a national nightly news program
Mary V. R. Thayer (1926), socialite, journalist, and author
Jeannette Walls (1984), gossip columnist for MSNBC; author of The Glass Castle
Sharon Waxman (born c.1963), journalist
Beverly Weintraub (1982), Pulitzer Prize-winning editorial writer for New York Daily News
Lis Wiehl (1983), legal analyst for Fox News
Ellen Willis (1960s), essayist and pop music critic
Julie Zeilinger (2015), feminist writer and editor

Musicians, singers, and composers
Laurie Anderson (1969), musician, NASA's first artist-in-residence and pioneer in electronic music, famous for her single "O Superman"
Sadie Dupuis (2011), vocalist for Speedy Ortiz
Dorothy Papadakos (1982), concert organist, playwright, and author
Louise Post, lead singer and guitarist of alternative rock band Veruca Salt
Roxanne Seeman (1975), songwriter
Faye-Ellen Silverman (1968), composer
Jeanine Tesori (1983), Broadway composer
Suzanne Vega (1981), singer-songwriter, "Luka", "Tom's Diner"

Playwrights, screenwriters, and directors
Jamie Babbit (1993), director of But I'm a Cheerleader and Itty Bitty Titty Committee, and television shows including Gilmore Girls, Alias, and Ugly Betty
June Bingham Birge (1940), author, playwright, great-granddaughter of Mayer Lehman
Debra Black (1976), Tony Award-winning producer, wife of Apollo Global Management co-founder Leon Black
Petra Costa (2006), Academy Award-nominated director, The Edge of Democracy, heiress to the Andrade Gutierrez fortune
Helen Deutsch (1927), screenwriter, Lili, National Velvet, King Solomon's Mines
Delia Ephron (1966), author, screenwriter, playwright, The Sisterhood of the Traveling Pants, You've Got Mail
Greta Gerwig (2006), actor, screenwriter, and Academy Award-nominated director, Lady Bird, Little Women
Stephanie Gillis (1990), writer, and Peabody Award-winning writer, (2020), “The Simpsons”; WGA Award-winning writer (2019); “The Simpsons”,   Emmy Award-nominated writer, “The Simpsons” (2010, 2015)
Maria Semple (1986), screenwriter, Arrested Development, Mad About You
Bettina Gilois (1985), screenwriter, Bessie, McFarland, USA
Gina Gionfriddo (1991), Pulitzer Prize-nominated playwright
Naomi Foner Gyllenhaal (1966), Golden Globe Award-winning screenwriter; mother of Maggie and Jake Gyllenhaal
Kait Kerrigan (2003), playwright
Bonnie Sherr Klein (1961), filmmaker and activist
Annie Leonard (1986), activist and director, The Story of Stuff
Ntozake Shange (1970), Obie Award-winning playwright, For Colored Girls Who Have Considered Suicide / When the Rainbow Is Enuf
Veena Sud (1989), director of Seven Seconds
Amy Talkington (1993), Emmy Award-nominated screenwriter, producer, writer
Linda Yellen (1969), Emmy Award-winning director, Northern Lights ; producer, Playing for Time
Juli Weiner (2010), Emmy Award-winning writer, Last Week Tonight with John Oliver

Political, social and judicial figures
 Sheila Abdus-Salaam (1974), judge of the New York Court of Appeals
 Ann Aldrich (1948), judge of the United States District Court for the Northern District of Ohio
 Elizabeth Moore Aubin (1987), nominee to serve as the United States Ambassador to Algeria
 Caroline Lexow Babcock (1904), co-founder of the Women's Peace Union and former secretary of the National Woman's Party
 Grace Lee Boggs (1935), author and political activist
 Margot Botsford (1969), associate justice of the Massachusetts Supreme Judicial Court
 Janet Lee Bouvier (1929), American socialite and mother of Jacqueline Kennedy Onassis
 Claire C. Cecchi (1986), judge of the United States District Court for the District of New Jersey 
 Miriam Goldman Cedarbaum (1952), United States District Court judge
 Hagar Chemali, Political Satirist, Writer, Producer, Television Personality, and Political Commentator
 Nora Hsiung Chu (1926), Chinese educator who served on the United Nations Commission on the Status of Women
 Ellie Cohanim (1995), broadcast journalist and Deputy Special Envoy to Monitor and Combat Anti-Semitism
 Sharon L. Cromer (1980), nominee to serve as United States Ambassador to the Gambia
 Mindy Domb (1981), representative of the Massachusetts House of Representatives' 3rd Hampshire district
 Ronnie Eldridge (1952), activist, businesswoman, politician, and television host
 Chai Feldblum (1979), commissioner of the Equal Employment Opportunity Commission
 Lila Fenwick (1953), first black woman to graduate from Harvard Law School and former United Nations official
 Muriel Fox (1948), public relations executive who in 1966 co-founded the National Organization for Women and led the communications effort that introduced the modern women's movement to the media of the world
 Paula Franzese (1980), professor of real property law at Seton Hall Law School
 Helen Gahagan (1924), United States House of Representatives Congresswoman from California
 E. Susan Garsh (1969), associate justice of the Massachusetts Superior Court
 Helene D. Gayle, M.D., M.P.H. (1970), president and CEO of CARE USA and chair of the Presidential Advisory Council on HIV/AIDS
 Nancy Gertner (1967), Judge on United States District Court for the District of Massachusetts
 Ellen F. Golden (1968), director, Women's Business Center, Coastal Enterprises, Inc., Wiscasset, Maine
 Diane Gujarati (1990), American lawyer, judge of the United States District Court for the Eastern District of New York
 Betty Hall (1943), American politician, New Hampshire state representative
 Cheryl Halpern (1975), chair of the Corporation for Public Broadcasting
 Patricia McMahon Hawkins (attended), United States Ambassador to Togo from 2008 to 2011
 Allegra "Happy" Haynes (1975), Denver politician who served on the Denver City Council 
 Susan Herman (1968), President of the American Civil Liberties Union; Professor at Brooklyn Law School
 Marian Blank Horn (1965), judge on the United States Court of Federal Claims
 Jessie Wallace Hughan (1898, Phi Beta Kappa), United States Senate candidate, author, teacher, founder of Alpha Omicron Pi fraternity
 Mila Jasey (1972), member of the New Jersey General Assembly representing the 27th Legislative District
 Helene L. Kaplan (1953), American lawyer with Skadden, Arps, Slate, Meagher & Flom, former chairman of the Carnegie Corporation of New York
 Judith Kaye (1958), first woman in highest position in state judiciary, Chief Judge of the New York Court of Appeals
 Katherine Kazarian (2012), American politician and member of the Rhode Island House of Representatives
 Claire R. Kelly (1987), judge on the United States Court of International Trade
 Christina Kishimoto (1992), current superintendent of the Hawai'i Department of Education
 Jeane Kirkpatrick (1948), first woman to serve as U.S. Ambassador to the United Nations
 Phyllis Lamphere (1943), former president of the Seattle City Council and the National League of Cities
 Linda Lee (2001), Member of the New York City Council from the 23rd district
 Mabel Ping-Hua Lee (1916), Chinese advocate for women's suffrage in the United States and the first woman to receive a PhD from Columbia University
 Wilma B. Liebman (1971), Chair, National Labor Relations Board
 Catherine McCabe (1973), acting Administrator of the Environmental Protection Agency in 2017 and commissioner of the New Jersey Department of Environmental Protection
 Loretta J. Mester (1980), 11th president of the Federal Reserve Bank of Cleveland
 Herminia Palacio (1983), former Deputy Mayor of New York City and CEO of Guttmacher Institute
 Hope Portocarrero (1950), first lady of Nicaragua, the wife of Anastasio Somoza Debayle
 Stephanie Garcia Richard (1996), former member of the New Mexico House of Representatives and current New Mexico Commissioner of Public Lands
 Paula Reimers (1969), Rabbi, political activist for Palestinian rights, gender equity, and religious freedom
 Rosalyn Richter (1976), associate justice of the Appellate Division of the New York Supreme Court, First Judicial Department
 Ramona Romero (1985), former general counsel of the United States Department of Agriculture, general counsel of Princeton University
Rhea Suh (1992), Assistant Secretary of the United States Department of the Interior and former president of the Natural Resources Defense Council
Marguerite Engler Schwarzman (1914), educator, activist for affordable housing, senior citizens
 Nina Shaw (1976), talent attorney whose clients include Jamie Foxx and Nick Cannon
 Shirley Adelson Siegel (1937), housing activist and advocate
 Madeline Singas (1988), district attorney for Nassau County, New York
 Jessica Stern (1985), policy consultant on terrorism who served on the United States National Security Council under Bill Clinton
 Audrey Strauss (1968), acting United States Attorney for the Southern District of New York replacing Geoffrey Berman
 Anna Diggs Taylor (1954), United States District Court judge
 Kang Tongbi (1907), daughter of Kang Youwei and political activist, member of the Chinese People's Political Consultative Conference
 Gloria Tristani (1974), former commissioner of the Federal Communications Commission, granddaughter of Senator Dennis Chávez
 Polly Trottenberg (1986), United States Deputy Secretary of Transportation and former Commissioner of the New York City Department of Transportation
 Anne Warburton (1946), first female British Ambassador, British Ambassador to Denmark from 1976 to 1983, and British Permanent Representative to the United Nations in Geneva from 1983 to 1985; president of Lucy Cavendish College, Cambridge University from 1985 to 1994
Barbara M. Watson (1943), first woman to serve as an Assistant Secretary of State, United States Ambassador to Malaysia
Helene White (1975), judge on the United States Court of Appeals for the Sixth Circuit
 Constance H. Williams (1966), Pennsylvania state senator from 2001 to 2009; daughter of Leon Hess, founder of the Hess Corporation
 Emma Wolfe (2001), Deputy Mayor of New York City and chief of staff to Bill de Blasio
 Mae Yih (1951), member of the Oregon House of Representatives and Oregon State Senate, first Chinese American to serve in a state senate in the United States

Religious figures
 Sara Hurwitz (1999), first woman to serve as a Rabba in the Orthodox Jewish clergy
Sharon Kleinbaum (1981), rabbi and leader of Congregation Beit Simchat Torah
Joy Levitt (1989), first female leader of the Reconstructionist Rabbinical Association

Spies
Marion Davis Berdecio (1943), accused Soviet spy in U.S. State Department, comrade of Coplon and Wovschin
Judith Coplon (1943), Soviet spy in U.S. Justice Department whose convictions were overturned on technicalities
Virginia Hall (1927), American spy with the Special Operations Executive during WWII.
Juliet Stuart Poyntz (1907), involved in intelligence activities for the Soviet OGPU; founding member of the Communist Party USA
Patricia Warner (1949), American spy and Congressional Gold Medal recipient
Flora Wovschin (1943), Soviet spy in U.S. State Department, stepdaughter of Columbia professor/Soviet spy Enos Wicher

Writers
Léonie Adams (1923), poet
Joan Abelove (1966), writer
Susan Mary Alsop (attended), Washingtonian socialite and writer
Mary Antin (1902), author of the immigrant experience
Charlotte Armstrong (1925), writer
Lura Beam (1908), writer and educator
Maria Semple (1986), writer, Where'd You Go, Bernadette
Jami Bernard (1978), writer and film critic
Fatima Bhutto (2004), Pakistani poet and writer, granddaughter of Pakistani president Zulfikar Ali Bhutto and member of the Bhutto family
Ann Brashares (1989), author of The Sisterhood of the Traveling Pants
Sasha Cagen (1996), writer
Hortense Calisher (1932), writer
Diana Chang (1949), pioneering Asian-American novelist
Melissa Clark (1990), American cookbook author and 2018 James Beard Foundation Award recipient
Cassandra Clare (1995), author of The Mortal Instruments
Rachel Cohn (1989), author of Nick & Norah's Infinite Playlist and Gingerbread
Nadine Jolie Courtney (2002), Bravo TV personality Newlyweds: The First Year and author of Beauty Confidential and Confessions of a Beauty Addict
Elise Cowen (1956), poet of the Beat Generation
Galaxy Craze (1993), novelist
Susan Daitch (1977), short story writer
Edwidge Danticat (1990), writer
Lydia Davis (1970), short story writer, essayist, winner of the International Booker Prize
Thulani Davis (1970), novelist who won the Grammy Award in 1992
Tory Dent (1981), poet and HIV/AIDS activist
Babette Deutsch (1917), author, poet, translator and critic
Marjorie Housepian Dobkin (1944), author; Barnard College professor and dean
Avni Doshi (2005), writer who is shortlisted for the 2020 Booker Prize
Francine du Plessix Gray (1952), Pulitzer Prize-nominated writer 
Hallie Ephron (1969), novelist
Cristina García (1983), author of Dreaming in Cuban
Mary Gordon (1971), writer and professor of English at Barnard College
Alexis Pauline Gumbs (2004), American writer, poet, activist
Indrani Aikath Gyaltsen (1970s), writer
Monique Raphel High (1969), novelist
Patricia Highsmith (1940), author of The Talented Mr. Ripley and The Price of Salt
Anne Hollander (1952), historian of fashion
Nansook Hong (1991), American writer, daughter-in-law of Unification church founder Sun Myung Moon
Helen Hoyt (1900s), poet
Zora Neale Hurston (1928), Harlem Renaissance writer
Elizabeth Janeway (1935), author and critic
Joyce Johnson (1955), writer, Minor Characters
June Jordan (1957), writer and activist
Erica Jong (1963), writer
Molly Jong-Fast (1997, according to her although it appears she only attended a summer program for high school students), writer
Alexa Junge (1984), writer for The West Wing and Friends
Loolwa Khazzoom (1991), Iraqi Jewish-American writer, journalist, and activist
Jolie Kerr (1998), American writer and podcast host on Heritage Radio Network
Suki Kim (1992), Guggenheim fellow; author of the award-winning novel The Interpreter and the New York Times bestselling literary nonfiction book, Without You, There Is No Us: Undercover Among the Sons of North Korea's Elite
Joan Kahn (late 1930s), mystery editor and anthologist; also novelist and children's writer
Mary Beth Keane (1999), American writer and 2015 Guggenheim fellow
Lily Koppel (2003), author of The Red Leather Diary and The Astronaut Wives Club; writer for the New York Times
Jhumpa Lahiri (1989), Pulitzer Prize–winning author of The Namesake and Interpreter of Maladies
Jane Leavy (1974), sports biographer
Kyle Lukoff (2006), transgender children's book author; Storytelling of Ravens and When Aidan Became a Brother
Florence Ripley Mastin (born 1886), poet.
Faith McNulty (1920s, attended one year), writer
Daphne Merkin (1975), literary critic, essayist, and novelist, daughter of philanthropist Hermann Merkin
Alice Duer Miller (1899), writer and advisory editor of The New Yorker
Ottessa Moshfegh (2002), 2016 Hemingway Foundation/PEN Award winner for Eileen
Diana Muir (1975), writer and historian
Alana Newhouse (1997), writer and editor of Tablet Magazine
Alice Notley (1967), poet
Sigrid Nunez (1972), novelist, Whiting Awards and the 2018 National Book Award for Fiction recipient
Iris Owens (1929–2008), novelist
Edie Parker (1940s), author; first wife of Jack Kerouac
Helena Percas de Ponseti (1940), writer, essayist, scholar, and professor
Chelsea Peretti (2000), writer and comedian
Marisha Pessl (2000), author of Special Topics in Calamity Physics
Julia Phillips (2010), American author, Disappearing Earth and finalist for the 2019 National Book Award for Fiction
Claudia Roth Pierpont (1979), staff writer of The New Yorker
Belva Plain (1939), writer
Jenelle Porter (1994), art curator and author
Ariana Reines (2002), poet
Kristen Roupenian (2003), writer, Cat Person, You Know You Want This
Lynne Sharon Schwartz (1959), writer
Courtney Sheinmel (1999), author of children's books
Lionel Shriver (1978), novelist and 2005 Orange Prize winner
Rachel Slade (1991), journalist, author of Into the Raging Sea, Mountbatten Maritime Prize winner 2019
Dean Spade (1997), writer, activist, lawyer, assistant professor of law at Seattle University School of Law
Eileen Tabios (1982), poet
Lauren Tarshis (1985), writer, and director at Scholastic Corporation
Camilla Trinchieri (1963), writer
Joan Vollmer (1943), Beat poet, partner of William S. Burroughs
Anne Elizabeth Wilson (1923) writer, poet, editor; pet cemetery owner
Cecily Wong (2010), writer
Julie Zeilinger (2015), blogger and feminist writer

Miscellaneous

Grace Banker (1915), telephone operator who served in the American Expeditionary Forces during World War I and led the Hello Girls, for which she received the Distinguished Service Medal
Maria Foscarinis (1977), activist, founder of the National Homelessness Law Center
Madeline Kripke (1965), book collector who held one of the world's largest collections of dictionaries, daughter of Jewish philanthropist and rabbi Myer S. Kripke
Susan Rosenberg, member of May 19th Communist Organization and charged with a role in the 1983 United States Senate bombing
Elana Maryles Sztokman (1991), American sociologist, writer, and Jewish feminist activist
Fumiko Yamaguchi (1925), Japanese physician and birth control advocate

Fictional alumnae
In the 1988 Woody Allen film Another Woman, Gena Rowland's character is a philosophy professor at Barnard.
 In the 1992 Woody Allen film Husbands and Wives, Juliette Lewis' character, Rain, is a Barnard student.
 In the 2005 Sigrid Nunez novel The Last of Her Kind, heroines Georgette George and Ann Drayton meet in 1968 as freshman roommates at Barnard.
In the 2007 Noah Baumbach film Margot at the Wedding, Nicole Kidman's character, a novelist, is a Barnard graduate.
 In the television series Mad Men, the character Rachel Menken is a Barnard graduate.
 In the 2015 film Mistress America, the lead character Tracy Fishko is a freshman at Barnard.
 In season 4 of the television series BoJack Horseman, it is mentioned that the title character's mother, Beatrice Horseman, attended Barnard.
In the 2018 Mira T. Lee novel Everything Here is Beautiful, the narrator talks about going to Barnard and reuniting there with one of her childhood friends from Tennessee.
In the 2018 Paul Feig film A Simple Favor, Anna Kendrick's character, Stephanie Smothers, was an English major at Barnard and did her thesis on The Canterbury Tales.

Notable faculty

Nadia Abu El Haj, anthropologist
Robert Antoni, Commonwealth Writers Prize–winning author
Randall Balmer, author and historian of American religion
Dave Bayer, mathematician; actor and math consultant for the film A Beautiful Mind; one of few holders of an Erdős-Bacon number
Ruth Benedict, anthropologist
Jenny Boylan, writer
Frank Brady, leading figure in international chess
Harriet Brooks, physicist
Tina Campt, Africana and Women's, Gender, and Sexuality Studies
Demetrios James Caraley, Editor of the Political Science Quarterly; President of the Academy of Political Science
Elizabeth Castelli, Professor Of Religion
John Cheever (1956–1957), Pulitzer Prize–winning novelist and short story writer
Yvette Christianse, poet, librettist
Alexander Cooley, political scientist, former director of the Harriman Institute
Dennis Dalton (1969–2008), political scientist; renowned nonviolence proponent; scholar of Mohandas Karamchand Gandhi
Pauline Hamilton Dederer (1878–1960), biologist; zoology instructor at Barnard before 1917
Celia Deutsch, professor, religious sister, academic, educator, writer, and Old Testament scholar
Rosalyn Deutsche, art historian, author, and art critic
Marjorie Housepian Dobkin, author
Patricia Louise Dudley (1929–2004), zoologist 
Mortimer Lamson Earle, classicist
Theodor Gaster, author; religion scholar; translator
Harry Gideonse (1901–1985), president of Brooklyn College, and chancellor of the New School for Social Research
Virginia Gildersleeve
Mary Gordon, writer
Elizabeth Hardwick, writer; co-founder of The New York Review of Books; wife of Robert Lowell
Ken Hechler, U.S. Congressman from West Virginia
Anne Higonnet, art historian, Guggenheim Fellow
Janet Jakobsen, religion and Women's, Gender, and Sexuality Studies
Rebecca Jordan-Young, Women's, Gender, and Sexuality Studies, author of Brain Storm: The Flaws in the Science of Sex Differences
Charles Knapp, PhD, philologist and classical scholar
Dorothy Y. Ko, historian of early China, Guggenheim Fellow
 Elizabeth Kujawinski, American oceanographer, Woods Hole Senior Scientist
Janna Levin, physicist
David Macklovitch, musician
Perry Mehrling, economic historian
Gabriela Mistral, first Latin American Nobel Prize winner for Literature
Samuel Alfred Mitchell, astronomer
Raymond Moley (1923–1933), proponent and later critic of the New Deal
Frederick Neuhouser, philosopher
Sigrid Nunez, novelist
Barbara Novak, art historian
Elaine Pagels (1970–1982), scholar of early and gnostic Christianity
Ben Philippe, Haitian-Canadian author and screenwriter
Alan F. Segal, ancient Judaism and origins of Christianity; author of Life after Death, and Paul the Convert
William C. Sharpe, cultural historian, Guggenheim Fellow
Edmund Ware Sinnott, botanist
Paige West, anthropologist, Guggenheim Fellow
Dolph Sweet, actor
Ashley Tuttle, former principal dancer at ABT; Tony-nominated actress
Elie Wiesel (1997–1999), Nobel Peace Prize–winning writer and activist

Recipients of the Medal of Distinction 

The Barnard Medal of Distinction is the College's highest honor.

1977
Joan Mondale

1978
Samuel R. Milbank
Richard Rodgers
Iphigene Ochs Sulzberger '14

1979
Adelyn Dohme Breeskin
Helen Gahagan Douglas '24
Eleanor Thomas Elliott '48
William Am Marstellar
Toni Morrison
Francis T. P. Plimpton

1980
Dorothy Height
Julius S. Held
 Mary Dublin Keyserling '30
Margaret Mahler
 Alan Pifer
Henriette H. Swope '25

1981
Robert L. Hoguet
Elizabeth Janeway '35
Beverly Sills

1982
Carol Bellamy
Raymond J. Saulnier
Twyla Tharp '63

1983
Mario Cuomo
Vernon Jordan, Jr.
Mirra Komarovsky '26

1984
Arthur Altschul
Annette Kar Baxter '47 (posthumous)
Joseph G. Brennan
Anna Hill Johnstone '34

1985
Marian Wright Edelman
Sidney Dillon Ripley
Elizabeth Man Sarcka '17

1986
A. Bartlett Giamatti
 Frances Lehman Loeb
Helen M. Ranney '41

1987
Judith Kaye '58
Sally Falk Moore '43
Rev. James Parks Morton
Ellen Stewart

1988
Augusta Souza Kappner '66
Ntozake Shange '70
Maxine Singer

1989
Joan Kaplan Davidson
Eugene Lang
 Bernice Segal (posthumous)
Lottie L. Taylor-Jones

1990
Jacqueline Barton '74
Robert L. Bernstein
Jean Blackwell Hutson '35
Julie V. Marsteller '69

1991
Miriam Goldman Cedarbaum '50
 Tisa Chang '63
 Mamphela Ramphele, delivered the 2002 Commencement address

1992
 Ingrith Johnson Deyrup-Olsen '40
Fred W. Friendly
Millicent Carey McIntosh
Frank Stella

1993
Arthur Ashe (posthumous)
Elizabeth B. Davis '41
Helene Lois Kaplan '53
Bette Bao Lord
Cyrus Vance

1994
Walter Cronkite
Ellen V. Futter '71
Barbara Stoler Miller '62 (posthumous)
Arthur Mitchell
Sheila E. Widnall

1995
Madeleine Albright
Rosemary Park Anastos
Derek Bok
Sissela Bok

1996
Rita R. Colwell
Kitty Carlisle Hart
Maya Lin
Dame Anne Warburton

1997
Sarah Brady
Merce Cunningham
Charlayne Hunter-Gault
Ruth Prawer Jhabvala

1998
Mary L. Good
Joan Ganz Cooney
David Aaron Kessler

1999
Zoe Caldwell
Abby Joseph Cohen
Esther Dyson
William T. Golden

2000
Doris Kearns Goodwin, delivered the 2000 Commencement address
Hanna Holborn Gray
Annie Leibovitz
Kathie L. Olson

2001
Morris Dees
Susan Hendrickson
Maxine Greene '38
Bernice Johnson Reagon, delivered the 2001 Commencement address
Barbara Novak '50
Alice Rivlin
Harold E. Varmus

2003
Susan Band Horwitz
Judith Miller '69, delivered the Commencement address
Martha Nussbaum

2004
Sylvia Earle
Louise Glück

2005
Carla D. Hayden
Amartya Sen

2006
Linda Greenhouse
Audra McDonald
Francine du Plessix Gray '52

2007
Joan Didion
Nicholas D. Kristof
Mary Patterson McPherson
Muriel Petioni
Anna Deavere Smith

2008
Thelma C. Davidson Adair
Michael Bloomberg, delivered the 2008 Commencement address
Billie Jean King
David Remnick
Judith Shapiro

2009
Hillary Clinton, delivered the 2009 Commencement address
Kay Murray
Indra Nooyi
Irene J. Winter '60

2010
Thelma Golden
Olympia J. Snowe
Meryl Streep, delivered the 2010 Commencement address
Shirley M. Tilghman

2011 
Sheryl Sandberg, COO of Facebook, delivered the 2011 Commencement address
Sylvia Rhone
Roberta Guaspari
Jenny Holzer

2012 
Barack Obama, President of the United States, delivered the 2012 Commencement address
Sally Chapman, Barnard Professor of Chemistry
Helene D. Gayle '76, President and CEO of CARE, USA
Evan Wolfson, founder and President of Freedom to Marry

2013
 Leymah Gbowee, recipient of the 2011 Nobel Peace Prize, delivered the 2013 Commencement address
 Elizabeth Diller, architect and designer of the High Line
 Lena Dunham, creator, director, writer and star of the HBO series Girls

2014
 Cecile Richards, president of the Planned Parenthood Federation
 Mahzarin Banaji, social psychologist and professor of social ethics at Harvard University
 Ursula Burns, chair and chief executive officer of Xerox
 Patti Smith, musician, poet, and artist

2015
 Samantha Power, academic and journalist 
 Simi Linton, expert on disability and the arts
 Nadia Lopez, principal of Mott Hall Bridges Academy
 Diana Nyad, long-distance swimmer and author

2016
 Anne-Marie Slaughter
 Chimamanda Ngozi Adichie
 Simone Campbell
 Shafi Goldwasser

2017
 Joanne Liu
 Johnnetta Cole
 Diane von Furstenberg
 Zainab Salbi

2018
 Abby Wambach
 Katherine Johnson
 Anna Quindlen ’74
 Rhea Suh ’92

2019
 Viola Davis
 Sana Amanat ’04
 Cherríe Moraga
 Shirley Adelson Siegel ’37

References

External links
 Past Speakers and Medalists

Barnard College
 
Barnard